Luo Xi (born December 15, 1987) is a Chinese female synchronised swimmer, reaching  in height.

She competed in the 2008 Summer Olympics in Beijing, the 2010 Asian Games in Guangzhou and the 2012 Summer Olympics in London.

Personal life
Luo Xi married former diver Hu Jia in 2013. She gave birth to a son in 2015.

References

Living people
1987 births
Chinese synchronized swimmers
Olympic synchronized swimmers of China
Synchronized swimmers at the 2008 Summer Olympics
Synchronized swimmers at the 2012 Summer Olympics
Olympic silver medalists for China
Olympic bronze medalists for China
Olympic medalists in synchronized swimming
Asian Games medalists in artistic swimming
Synchronized swimmers from Hubei
Artistic swimmers at the 2010 Asian Games
Medalists at the 2012 Summer Olympics
Medalists at the 2008 Summer Olympics
World Aquatics Championships medalists in synchronised swimming
Synchronized swimmers at the 2011 World Aquatics Championships
Synchronized swimmers at the 2009 World Aquatics Championships
Synchronized swimmers at the 2005 World Aquatics Championships
Asian Games gold medalists for China
Medalists at the 2010 Asian Games
Swimmers from Wuhan